Xerocrassa seetzeni is a species of air-breathing land snail, a terrestrial pulmonate gastropod mollusk in the family Geomitridae.

Distribution 
Xerocrassa seetzeni is native to the Near East region, from Syria to northern Saudi Arabia.

In the area of the Negev desert in Israel, investigated by Yom-Tov (1970), Xerocrassa seetzeni was the most common snail species.

References

 Forcart, L. (1976). Die Cochlicellinae und Helicellinae von Palästina und Sinai. Archiv für Molluskenkunde, 106 [1975] (4/6): 123-189. Frankfurt am Main
 Neubert, E. (1998). Annotated checklist of the terrestrial and freshwater molluscs of the Arabian Peninsula with descriptions of new species. Fauna of Arabia. 17: 333-461.

External links
 Pfeiffer, L. (1847). Diagnosen neuer Heliceen. Zeitschrift für Malakozoologie. Cassel. 4 (1): 12-16
 Mousson, A. (1861). Coquilles terrestres et fluviatiles recueillies par M. le Prof. J.R. Roth dans son dernier voyage en Orient. Vierteljahrsschrift der Naturforschenden Gesellschaft in Zürich, 6 (1): 1-34; 6 (2): 124-156. Zürich.
 Charpentier, J. de. (1847). Uebersicht der durch Herrn Edm. Boissier von einer Reise nach Palästina mit zurückgebrachten Conchylien. Zeitschrift für Malakozoologie. 4 (9): 129-144. Cassel
 Germain, L. (1911). Note préliminaire sur les mollusques terrestres et fluviatiles recueillis par M. H. Gadeau de Kerville pendant son voyage en Syrie. Bulletin du Muséum National d'Histoire Naturelle. 17(1): 27-32
 Neubert, E.; Amr, Z. S.; Waitzbauer, W.; Al Talafha, H. (2015). Annotated checklist of the terrestrial gastropods of Jordan (Mollusca: Gastropoda). Archiv für Molluskenkunde. 144(2): 169-238. 

seetzeni
Gastropods described in 1847